Chu Văn Tập (11 February 1913 – 6 May 2014), better known by his pen name Học Phi, was a famous Vietnamese novelist and playwright. He was awarded the Hồ Chí Minh Prize in 1996.

References

1913 births
2014 deaths
Vietnamese dramatists and playwrights
Vietnamese centenarians
20th-century dramatists and playwrights
Men centenarians